St Michael and All Angels may refer to:

 Michaelmas, a saints day in the Christian calendar
 St Michael and All Angels Church (disambiguation) — various churches of that name
 Community of St. Michael & All Angels, a religious order in South Africa